Lee Bermejo is an American comic book writer and artist whose published work includes interior illustrations and cover art. He is best known for his collaborations with writer Brian Azzarello including Lex Luthor: Man of Steel, the Joker graphic novel, and Before Watchmen: Rorschach.

Career
Lee Bermejo's career began in 1997 as an intern at WildStorm. He is self-taught, with little formal art training. His first credited comics work appeared in Gen¹³ #43 (Sept. 1999) Together with writer Joe Kelly and co-artist Doug Mahnke, Bermejo crafted the "What's So Funny About Truth, Justice & the American Way?" story in Action Comics #775 (March 2001). He and writer Brian Azzarello collaborated on the Lex Luthor: Man of Steel limited series in 2005 and the Joker graphic novel in 2008. In 2009, Bermejo drew the Superman story in the Wednesday Comics limited series. Bermejo both wrote and drew the Batman: Noël graphic novel in 2011. He and Azzarello worked together again on the Before Watchmen: Rorschach limited series in 2012–2013. 

In 2015, Bermejo launched the Suiciders series for Vertigo and We Are Robin for the main DC Comics line. Bermejo drew the 2000s variant cover for Action Comics #1000 (June 2018).

Bibliography

Interior art

BOOM! Studios

A Vicious Circle #1-3 (with Mattson Tomlin), (2022–2023)

DC Comics

Action Comics #775 (with Doug Mahnke), #800, 836 (among other artists) (2001–2006)
Batman Black and White vol. 2 #3 Rule Number One (2014)
Batman: Damned #1–3 (2018–2019)
Batman / Deathblow: After the Fire #1–3 (2002)
Batman: Dear Detective graphic novel (2022)
Batman: Noël graphic novel (2011)
Before Watchmen: Rorschach miniseries, #1–4 (2012–2013)
Joker graphic novel (2008)
Lex Luthor: Man of Steel miniseries #1–5 (2005)
Superman vol. 2 #202 (Lex Luthor preview) (2004)
Superman/Batman #75 (two pages) (2010)
Superman/Gen 13 #1–3 (2000)
Wednesday Comics #1–12 (Superman (one-page each issue)(2009)
Mad Max: Fury Road: Inspired Artists (among other artists) (2015)

Vertigo
100 Bullets #26 (among other artists) (2001)
Hellblazer #182–183 (2003)
Suiciders #1–6 (2015)
Suiciders: Kings of Hell.A. #1–6 (2016)

WildStorm
Gen¹³ #43–44; #66 (among other artists) (1999–2001)
Gen¹³: Carny Folk #1 (2000)
Global Frequency #9 (2003)
Resident Evil: Fire & Ice miniseries #1–4 (2000–2001)
Robotech #0 (among other artists) (2003)
Wildcats Annual #1 (2000)

Image Comics
Resident Evil #1–3 (1998)

Marvel Comics
All-New X-Men #25 (among other artists) (2014)
Daredevil vol. 2 #100 (among other artists) (2007)
MARVEL # 6 (among other artists) (2020)

Cover work

Action Comics #1000 variant
Adventures of Superman #575, 617–618
Area 10 graphic novel (2010)
Batman: Dear Detective one-shot (2022)
Batman: Gotham Knights #50–55
The Bronx Kill graphic novel (2010)
Checkmate #1–5
The Chill graphic novel (2010)
Daredevil #88–93, 100
Dark Entries graphic novel (2009)
Dark Reign Elektra #1–5
Fear Itself Captain America #7.2 variant
Fight Club 2 #1 variant
Filthy Rich graphic novel (2009)
Hellblazer #218, 221–238, 243–255
Rumble #6 variant
The Stand: Captain Trips #1–5
The Stand: American Nightmares #1–5
X-Men: Legacy #220–224

Awards
 IGN Comics Award - Best Graphic Novel 2008 Joker (DC Comics)
 2015 Eisner Awards - Best Short Story for "Rule Number One"  (nominated)

References

External links
 
 
 Lee Bermejo at DC Comics
 Lee Bermejo at Mike's Amazing World of Comics
 Lee Bermejo at the Unofficial Handbook of Marvel Comics Creators

20th-century American artists
21st-century American artists
American comics artists
DC Comics people
Living people
Marvel Comics people
Year of birth missing (living people)